Rodiasine is a cyclic bisbenzylisoquinoline alkaloid that was first isolated from the South American greenheart tree Chlorocardium rodiei. The synthesis of O-demethylrodiasine (antioquine) and its derivatives, and the possible application of these compounds as anti-cancer, calcium channel blockers, and anti-parasitic drugs has been described.

References 

Benzylisoquinoline alkaloids